Werner Girke (born 4 September 1940) is a German long-distance runner. He competed in the men's 5000 metres at the 1968 Summer Olympics.

References

1940 births
Living people
Athletes (track and field) at the 1968 Summer Olympics
German male long-distance runners
Olympic athletes of West Germany
People from Polkowice County
20th-century German people